Enrique Pérez may refer to:
Enrique Pérez de Guzmán, 2nd Count of Niebla (1375–1436), Spanish military figure
Enrique Pérez de Guzmán, 4th Duke of Medina Sidonia (died 1512), Spanish duke
Enrique Pérez (rower) (1896-?), Spanish rower
Enrique Pérez Colman (1896–1957), Argentine politician
Enrique Pérez Santiago (1916–1999), Puerto Rican hematologist
Enrique Pérez Díaz (born 1938), known as Pachin, Spanish footballer
Enrique Pérez (footballer) (born 1988), Mexican footballer
Kike Pérez (born 1997), Spanish footballer

See also
Enrique López Pérez (born 1991), Spanish tennis player